HD 196050 b is a 1378-day extrasolar planet with a minimum mass of 2.90 Jupiter mass. The average orbital distance is 2.54 astronomical units or 380 gigameters or 12.3 microparsecs. The orbital eccentricity is 22.8%. The periastron (closest) distance is 1.96 AU and the apastron (farthest) distance is 3.12 AU. The average orbital velocity is 20.1 km/s and the semi-amplitude is 49.7 m/s. The longitude of periastron is 187° and the time of periastron is 2,450,843 JD.

The planet is typically discovered by using Doppler spectrometer by looking for shifts in the spectrum of the star. In Australia, Jones et al. found this planet in 2002 by using the telescope in Anglo-Australian Observatory.

See also 
 HD 190228 b
 HD 195019 b

References 
 web preprint

External links 
 

Exoplanets discovered in 2002
Giant planets
Pavo (constellation)
Exoplanets detected by radial velocity